Ardisiandra is a genus of flowering plants belonging to the family Primulaceae.

Its native range is Tropical African Mountains.

Species:

Ardisiandra primuloides 
Ardisiandra sibthorpioides 
Ardisiandra wettsteinii

References

Primulaceae
Primulaceae genera
Afromontane flora